Zootecus is a genus of gastropods belonging to the family Achatinidae.

The species of this genus are found in Africa and Western Asia.

Species:

Zootecus agrensis 
Zootecus chion 
Zootecus contiguus 
Zootecus estellus 
Zootecus insularis 
Zootecus lucidissimus 
Zootecus pertica 
Zootecus polygyratus 
Zootecus pullus

References

Gastropods